The men's baseball tournament at the 2015 Pan American Games in Toronto, Canada was held at the Pan Am Ball Park in Ajax, Ontario from July 11 to 19. Two fields hosted competition, with the main one holding 4,000 spectators and the secondary one holding 1,000 seats.

For these Games, the men competed in a 7-team tournament. The teams were grouped into one single pool and all teams played each other in a round-robin preliminary round. The top four teams will advance to the semifinals.

Canada are the defending champions from the 2011 Pan American Games in Guadalajara, defeating The United States, 2–1 in the final.

Qualification
A total of seven men's teams qualified to compete. The host nation Canada along with the United States (for its contributions to the game) qualified automatically. The top four teams at the 2014 Central American and Caribbean Games also qualified. The last qualifier saw one team qualify from the 2015 South American Championships. Men's rosters can have a maximum of 24 athletes.

Men

Medalists

Rosters

At the start of tournament, all seven participating countries had up to 24 players on their rosters.

Results
The official detailed schedule was revealed on April 20, 2015.

All times are Eastern Daylight Time (UTC−4)

Preliminary round

Medal round

Semifinals

Bronze medal match

Gold medal match

Final standings

References

Baseball at the 2015 Pan American Games
2015 in baseball